Ekramy Ahmad El-Shahat (born October 26, 1955) is an Egyptian former footballer. He played for the Egyptian side Al Ahly as well as Egypt in between 1971–1987, he is one of the best African Goalkeepers of all time in popular view.

Biography
Ekramy known as "Africa Monster", as some fans called him, was born in the city of Suez in October 1955. He joined Al Ahly's youth in 1969. After less than two years, he was promoted to the first team in 1971, and played his first match in a friendly against Suez SC, in a period in which sports activities were dormant, due to the War of Attrition; however, Al Ahly managed to win 5–1.
 	
The official debut of the Ekramy was difficult with Al Ahly, as he played against Al Ittihad in the 1972–1973 season, in which Al Ahly were defeat at home 0–1. Hence, people predicted that he would be dropped as the first choice goalkeeper, but coach Abdu Saleh El-Wahsh had faith in him, and gave him an opportunity against Ismaily, when Al Ahly won 1–0, which helped Ekramy to commence his career.

Later on, Ekramy participated in more than 300 games with Al Ahly, to break the previous record of Adel Hekal, who played in 14 consecutive years.

Ekramy decided to retire from the game in 1987, having spent with Al Ahly more than 18 years, that helped him to win the Egyptian League 10 times, Egyptian Soccer Cup five times, the African Cup Winners' Cup three times, and the CAF Champions League once.

He played for the Egyptian national team in FIFA World Cup qualifying matches, in addition to three African Cup of Nations, and the 1975 Mediterranean Games.

Personal life
Two of his sons, Ahmad Ekramy (1980–2006) and Sherif Ekramy also played as goalkeepers for Al Ahly.

References

External links

1955 births
Living people
Egyptian footballers
Egypt international footballers
Association football goalkeepers
Al Ahly SC players
1976 African Cup of Nations players
1980 African Cup of Nations players
1984 African Cup of Nations players
Competitors at the 1975 Mediterranean Games
Egyptian Premier League players
People from Suez
Mediterranean Games competitors for Egypt
20th-century Egyptian people
21st-century Egyptian people